Mackenzie Frances Ziegler (born June 4, 2004) is an American singer, actress, former dancer, and internet personality. She appeared as a child for six years on the Lifetime reality dance series Dance Moms together with her older sister, dancer and actress Maddie Ziegler.

Ziegler's music career began with her 2014 studio album, Mack Z. In 2018 she released her second studio album, Phases. She has joined singer Johnny Orlando in joint concert tours in North America and Europe and has released several other singles with Orlando and several solo releases. In 2017 and 2018, Ziegler traveled in Australia and New Zealand on dance workshop tours with her sister. She has also modeled for Polo Ralph Lauren.

In addition to Dance Moms, Ziegler has appeared on other television series, including the sitcom Nicky, Ricky, Dicky & Dawn (2015 and 2017). From 2018 to 2020, she starred in the Brat TV high school drama series Total Eclipse. She also competed on Dancing with the Stars: Juniors and starred as Dorothy in a holiday stage pantomime adaptation, The Wonderful Winter of Oz, in Pasadena, California.

As of February 2022, Ziegler has accumulated more than 14 million Instagram followers, 22 million TikTok followers, 3 million YouTube subscribers, and one million Twitter followers.

Early life
Ziegler was born in Pittsburgh, Pennsylvania, to Melissa Ziegler-Gisoni and Kurt Ziegler and grew up in Murrysville, Pennsylvania. She is of Polish, Italian and German descent. Her parents divorced when she was 6 years old after a 2009 bankruptcy. Her mother remarried Greg Gisoni in 2013. Ziegler has an older sister, Maddie, who is also a dancer and actress, as well as two older paternal half-brothers, Ryan and Tyler, and two older step-siblings, Matthew and Michelle. She began dancing at the Abby Lee Dance Company in Pittsburgh at the age of two. With that company, she won titles in dance competitions. Ziegler was homeschooled.

Since August 2020, Ziegler has been dating Tacoda Dubbs.

Career

2011–2016: Dance Moms and Mack Z
Ziegler first appeared on television in 2011 on Lifetime's reality dance show Dance Moms, alongside her mother and sister. In 2016, the Zieglers left the show after six seasons to pursue other projects. Ziegler also appeared on Dance Moms''' sister shows Abby's Ultimate Dance Competition and Abby's Studio Rescue.

In 2014, Ziegler released her debut album titled Mack Z, which she also used as a stage name for singing appearances. The album peaked at #1 on the iTunes pop charts, as well as #7 on iTunes' albums sales chart across all genres. The music video for the album's lead single, "Girl Party", also reached #1 on the iTunes pop chart. The video of the single has been viewed more than 80 million times. Later that year, her videos for "Shine" and "Christmas All Year Long" premiered. She continued to release singles and videos as Mack Z in 2015 and 2016. In 2014, Ziegler and her sister released a limited edition fashion line, The Maddie & Mackenzie Collection, through Mod Angel.

In 2015, Ziegler made her acting debut on Nickelodeon's sitcom Nicky, Ricky, Dicky & Dawn and appeared in a WowWee commercial alongside her sister. She returned to Nicky, Ricky, Dicky & Dawn in January 2017 in the episode "Keeping Up with the Quadashians". Also in 2015, she walked the Polo Ralph Lauren Runway in New York City and appeared in an ad campaign video for Glamour Magazine.

2016–2017: Music and touring
In November 2016, Ziegler released her first single under her full name, a duet with singer Johnny Orlando, titled "Day & Night". The duet's music video was released on December 21, 2016, and has been viewed more than 24 million times. In 2017–2018, Ziegler and Orlando presented their Day & Night Tour throughout North America and the UK. Her 2017 video "Breathe" has been viewed more than 45 million times, and the video of her 2018 duet with Orlando, "What If", has been viewed more than 60 million times.

In 2016, she and her sister were the faces of Clean & Clear's fall back-to-school campaign. Ziegler was the face of Polo Ralph Lauren's children's spring 2016 collection and was named a brand ambassador for girls' fashion line Emily West in 2017. In 2016, Ziegler collaborated with TurnBoard to release the Kenzie Ziegler TurnBoard, a turning practice tool for dancers."Kenzie Ziegler TurnBoard" , BalletIsFun.com. Retrieved December 27, 2016 In 2017 and 2018, Ziegler collaborated on dance-inspired activewear clothing lines with tween retailer Justice. Justice also collaborated with her on a video of her song, "Teamwork", a back-to-school social media campaign with an anti-bullying theme, to promote the line. Later that year, Ziegler released a tee-shirt line called Tee4Too, and, with FanJoy in 2019, she released a line of sweatshirts and tee-shirts.

Ziegler and her sister conducted a dance workshop tour of Australia in January 2017.Ziegler, Maddie and Mackenzie. "Australian Tour: Ziegler Girls 2017" , ziegleraustraliatour.com. Retrieved December 11, 2016 Ziegler is featured in a 2017 dance advertisement for General Electric. They conducted another dance workshop tour of Australia and New Zealand in mid-2018.

2018–present: Total Eclipse and Dancing with the Stars Juniors
From 2018 to 2020, Ziegler starred as Cassie, a teenage girl coping with unpopularity, in the high school drama series Total Eclipse on the Brat TV digital network. She was an executive producer for the show. She also co-starred as the same character in the film Brat Holiday Spectacular (2018). In February 2018, Ziegler and her sister appeared on The Slow Mo Guys YouTube channel. She appeared on the cover of the April/May 2018 issue of Girls' Life magazine. Ziegler released a self-help book in May 2018, titled Kenzie's Rules for Life: How to be Happy, Healthy, and Dance to Your Own Beat, "a collection of inspirational, upbeat lessons for kids learning to navigate life." The book ranked No. 7 on the Publishers Weekly best-seller list for juvenile non-fiction. In fall 2018, Ziegler launched her own cosmetics line, "Love, Kenzie".

Ziegler was a contestant on Dancing with the Stars: Juniors in 2018, reaching the finals. On one episode of this show she danced together with her sister for the first time on television since Dance Moms. On November 20, 2018, Ziegler released her second studio album, Phases. One of the singles on the album, "Wonderful", was written by Sia, and Ziegler premiered the song on Dancing with the Stars. In December 2018, Ziegler starred as Dorothy in a holiday stage pantomime adaptation, The Wonderful Winter of Oz, in Pasadena, California. In mid-2019, Ziegler signed with Arista Records and toured the US as the warm-up act for PrettyMuch. She stars as the title character in an animated film, released in the US in November 2019 with the American title Ice Princess Lily, about an ice princess who befriends a dragon to defeat the evil snowman who rules her land.

Ziegler and her sister were guest judges in 2020 on the Quibi dance competition show Floored. She duetted with Sia on her song "Exhale", released in June 2020. In 2020–2021, Ziegler competed on The Masked Singer spin-off The Masked Dancer as "Tulip" and finished in third place.

Philanthropy
In 2012, Ziegler, along with her mother and sister, partnered with Starlight Children's Foundation to help raise awareness for chronically ill youth. Ziegler has also partnered with foundations such as Love Your Melon and Dancers Against Cancer to raise awareness and funding for childhood cancer. In 2016, Ziegler and her sister made a public service announcement for DoSomething.org's Birthday Mail campaign, which enables people to send homemade birthday cards to children living in homeless shelters. The same organization placed the Ziegler sisters on their 2016 list of charitable young celebrities. Ziegler has also joined her sister to support Dancers Against Cancer.

In 2018, Ziegler performed at the first We Day Alberta in Edmonton, Alberta, Canada. She appeared on Celebrity Family Feud in 2019 together with her sister, mother, aunt and dancer Charlize Glass, playing for "My Friend's Place", where they have volunteered in the past, which provides meals for homeless youth in Los Angeles.

Reception and accolades
As of 2022, Ziegler's Instagram account, "Kenzie", has more than 14 million followers, she has more than 22 million followers on TikTok, her two YouTube channels have received a total of more than 500 million views, with more than 3 million subscribers on her main channel, and she has more than one million Twitter followers under her nickname, "Kenzie". Refinery29 included her on its 2017 list of 29 young actors, singers and activists "on the verge of superstardom." The same year, Tiger Beat named her to its annual list of "19 Under 19". Ziegler won the 2018 Teen Choice Awards for Choice Muser.

Credits

Television and film

Web

Stage

Music videos

 Tours 
Headlining
 The Ziegler Girls 2017 tour of Australia (with Maddie Ziegler)
 Day & Night Tour with Johnny Orlando (2017)
 Maddie & Mackenzie Australia & New Zealand Tour 2018 (with Maddie Ziegler)

Opening act
 FOMO Tour (2019; PrettyMuch)

Discography

Albums

Awards and nominations

See also
 List of dancers

References

External links
 
 
 "Maddie and Mackenzie Ziegler Dance Like Fall’s Major Trends", Glamour Magazine (2015)
 Ziegler's TigerBeat'' cover and feature (2016)
 Total Eclipse, Episode 1 (2018)

2004 births
21st-century American actresses
21st-century American dancers
21st-century American singers
21st-century American women singers
Actresses from Pittsburgh
American child actresses
American people of German descent
American people of Italian descent
American people of Polish descent
American female dancers
American television actresses
American web series actresses
Dancers from Pennsylvania
Living people
Participants in American reality television series
People from Murrysville, Pennsylvania
American TikTokers
American women pop singers
American child singers
Child pop musicians